Immortals is a 2011 American fantasy action film directed by Tarsem Singh Dhandwar and starring Henry Cavill, Stephen Dorff, Luke Evans, John Hurt, Isabel Lucas, Kellan Lutz, Freida Pinto, Joseph Morgan, Daniel Sharman, and Mickey Rourke. The film was previously named Dawn of War and War of the Gods before being officially named Immortals. It uses motifs of the Greek myths of Theseus, the return of the Heraclids, the Minotaur, and the Titanomachy, but the plot does not resemble any coherent narrative originating from Greek mythology.

Principal photography began in Montreal on April 5, 2010. The film was released in 2D and in 3D (using the Real D 3D and Digital 3D formats) on November 11, 2011 by Relativity Media, becoming a commercial success at the box office by grossing over $226 million. Premiering in Los Angeles on November 8, 2011, the film received mixed reviews; critics praised Tarsem's direction and visuals, the ensemble cast, action sequences, production and costume design, and music score, but criticized the film's storytelling and the lack of character development.

Plot
When the Twelve Olympians imprisoned the Titans beneath Mount Tartarus, they lost the Epirus Bow. The genocidal king Hyperion searches for the bow to release the Titans. Hyperion captures the virgin oracle Phaedra, to use her dreams and visions to find it. 

Theseus is a hoplite trained by the Old Man, who says Theseus has been chosen by the gods. He and his mother Aethra are outcasts due to Theseus being a bastard child. Hyperion attacks Theseus' village. Theseus kills many of his men before being captured and forced to watch as Hyperion murders Aethra. 

The Olympians, especially Athena, are sympathetic to the humans suffering at Hyperion's hands, but are forbidden by Zeus to interfere in mortal affairs. Unless the Titans are released, they must have faith in mankind's free will to defeat Hyperion. Zeus himself as trained Theseus in the guise of the Old man, but reasons he has helped him as a human as opposed to a god. 

Theseus is made a slave in a salt mine. Phaedra, held captive nearby, sees a vision of Theseus embracing Hyperion. Phaedra and her sisters attack Hyperion's guards, provoking a riot. She uses the chaos to escape with Theseus and other slaves. They pursue Hyperion, but are overwhelmed by his forces when trying to seize a boat. Poseidon, unseen by Zeus, dives from Olympus into the ocean causing a tidal wave that wipes out Hyperion's men. Afterward, Phaedra sees a vision of Theseus standing near a shrouded body. She takes this to mean that Theseus must return home to bury Aethra.

As Theseus buries his mother in the village's sacred labyrinth, he discovers the Epirus Bow in rock. He frees it, but is attacked by Hyperion's henchman the Beast, whose armour resembles a Minotaur. Theseus kills him and uses the Bow to kill his allies' captors before collapsing from poisoned scratches inflicted by the Beast. Phaedra tends Theseus. Having fallen in love with him, she begs him to take her virginity, stripping her of the visions she deems a curse and they have sex.

They return to Phaedra's temple to kill Hyperion but are lured into an ambush and the bow is seized by Hyperion's hyena. Ares directly intervenes to save Theseus, killing the attackers. Athena then provides them with horses to reach Mount Tartarus. Zeus suddenly descends and kills Ares for disobeying his law, he spares Athena's life because she did not physically interfere like Ares did. Zeus tells Theseus that he and his allies will receive no more aid from the gods as he must justify the faith that Zeus has in him alone.

Theseus warns King Cassander, leader of the Hellenic resistance, of Hyperion's plans to destroy the Hellens and release the Titans, but Cassander dismisses the gods as myth, intending to negotiate peace. Hyperion uses the Bow to breach the city's immense wall, killing many defenders. Theseus rallies the Hellenic army and leads them against Hyperion. Hyperion storms through, kills Cassander, and before Theseus can stop him, uses the Epirus Bow to blast open the mountain and free the Titans. Zeus and the gods descend to battle the Titans, and urge Theseus to fight Hyperion; Zeus destroys the Epirus Bow with Ares' Warhammer. The gods prove more powerful than the Titans, but are overwhelmed, and all are killed except Zeus and a badly wounded Poseidon. As Athena dies, she begs Zeus to not abandon mankind. Hyperion mortally wounds Theseus, but Theseus overpowers and drives a knife into him in an "embrace". Zeus collapses Mount Tartarus on the Titans and Hyperion's men and ascends to Olympus with Athena's body and Theseus. 

With time Theseus' story becomes legend. Phaedra gives birth to Theseus' son Acamas. The Old Man tells Acamas that he will fight against evil. Acamas sees the sky filled with Olympians, Titans and Theseus, in battle.

Cast

Additional actors include Canadian wrestler Robert Maillet who plays the Beast, Kaniehtiio Horn, Ayisha Issa and Mercedes Leggett as Phaedra's oracle sisters, Corey Sevier as Apollo, Steve Byers as Heracles and Mark Margolis in an uncredited role as the priest of Phaedra's temple.

Production

This film incorporates some elements from classical Greek myths and was filmed using 3D technology. Director Tarsem Singh said that he was planning an action film using Renaissance painting styles. He then went on to say that the film is "Basically, Caravaggio meets Fight Club. It's a really hardcore action film done in Renaissance painting style. I want to see how that goes; it's turned into something really cool. I'm going for a very contemporary look on top of that so I'm kind of going with, you know, Renaissance time with electricity. So it's a bit like Baz Luhrmann doing Romeo + Juliet in Mexico; it's just taking a particular Greek tale and half (make it contemporary) and telling it." The film had a production budget of $80 million ($75 million after tax rebates) to $120 million and cost "at least" $35 million to market.

Soundtrack
The score for the film was composed, produced and conducted by Trevor Morris and has been released on November 8, 2011.

Release

The film premiered in Los Angeles on November 8, 2011, and was released on November 11, 2011 in the United States.

Reception

Box office
In North America, it was released on November 11, 2011. Immortals had a $1.4 million midnight showings and then grossed a total of $14.8 million on its opening day, topping the daily box office. It then finished the weekend of November 11–13, 2011 at #1 with $32.2 million, ranking as Relativity Media's biggest opening weekend to date, against newcomers J. Edgar and Jack and Jill. 3D showings accounted for a substantial 66% of the weekend gross. The film's audience was 60 percent male, 75 percent under the age of 35.

Outside North America, it earned $38 million overseas from 35 countries on its opening weekend. Its highest-grossing territories were Russia ($8.2 million), China ($5.7 million) and South Korea ($4.5 million). The film has earned $83,504,017 in the United States and Canada and $143,400,000 in other countries, for a worldwide total of $226,904,017.

Critical reception
On Rotten Tomatoes, the film has an approval rating of 49% based on 138 reviews, with an average rating of 5.4/10. The website's critical consensus states: "The melding of real sets, CG work, and Tarsem's signature style produces fireworks, though the same can't be said for Immortals''' slack, boring storytelling." On Metacritic, the film has a score of 46 out of 100, based on 23 critics, indicating "mixed or average reviews". Audiences polled by CinemaScore gave the film an average grade of "B" on an A+ to F scale, rising to a "B+" among viewers under 25.

In an affectionate but unfavorable review, Roger Ebert gave the film two stars out of four, writing, "Immortals is without doubt the best-looking awful movie you will ever see," while The Guardian gave the film three stars out of five, commenting, "Theseus battles the Titans in a cheerfully idiotic mythological yarn ballasted by Tarsem's eyecatching image-making". Todd McCarthy of The Hollywood Reporter wrote, "Thuddingly ponderous, heavy-handed and lacking a single moment that evinces any relish for movie-making, this lurch back from the "history" of 300 into the mists of Greek myth is a drag in nearly every way, from the particulars of physical torture to the pounding score that won't quit."

Of those who praised the picture, it received an honorable mention from MTV as one of the year's best films as well as making Guy Lodge's top twenty films of 2011 list on HitFix. Furthermore, it was on TORO Magazine's Top Ten list as well as Glasgow To The Movies Top Ten Films of 2011. Marc Eastman, of Are You Screening, named Immortals the #3 film of 2011. It also was nominated for several Saturn Awards, including Best Fantasy Film. The film is now viewed as a cult hit and was recently named as one of the top ten underrated fantasy films of the decade by Screen Rant. It was also named one of Vocal Media’s Five Most Under Appreciated Fantasy Films in 2018.

Accolades

Release

Home mediaImmortals was released on DVD, Blu-ray Disc, and Blu-ray 3D on March 5, 2012 in the United Kingdom and on March 6, 2012 in the United States and Canada. In its first week of release 20th Century Fox Home Entertainment sold more than 1.2 million units of the film making it the week's #1 film in Home Entertainment. It sold 648,947 DVD units for a total of $11,116,462 and 926,964 Blu-ray Disc units for a total of $21,310,902 for the week ending March 11, 2012. An additional 100,000 3D units sold totaling almost $40,000,000 in home entertainment sales in its first week of release in the United States.

Comic book
Archaia Press released a graphic novel tie-in titled Immortals: Gods and Heroes'', the hardcover book featured new stories that expanded on the universe established in the film.

See also
 The brazen bull, an ancient Greek device of torture and execution, is applied in the film to the maidens of the oracle.

References

External links
 

2011 films
Greek-language films
2011 3D films
American epic films
Canadian action adventure films
American fantasy adventure films
Films based on classical mythology
2010s action adventure films
2010s fantasy adventure films
Films set in ancient Greece
Films set in Crete
Relativity Media films
Rogue (company) films
Universal Pictures films
Films directed by Tarsem Singh
Films shot in Montreal
American action adventure films
Fiction about deicide
Phaedra
Cultural depictions of Theseus
2010s English-language films
2010s American films
2010s Canadian films